The Lorentz Institute is the institute for theoretical physics at Leiden University the Netherlands. It was established in 1921 and was named after physicist Hendrik Lorentz. Together with the experimental physics groups in the Kamerlingh Onnes Laboratory and the Huygens Laboratory, it makes up the Leiden Institute of Physics. The Lorentz Institute participates in two research schools: the Casimir Research School (jointly with Delft University of Technology) and the Dutch Research School of Theoretical Physics.

External links
Lorentz Institute website

Research institutes in the Netherlands
Hendrik Lorentz
Research institutes established in 1921